José Jaime Lloreda Ferrón (born November 10, 1980) is a Panamanian professional basketball player. He is a longtime member of the Panama men's national basketball team.

College career
Lloreda played two years of junior college ball for Dixie State College in St. George, Utah after graduating from the Berkshire Academy in Homestead, Florida. He was a dominant power forward in two years for the Ragin' Red, averaging 16.4 points and 10.5 rebounds per game in his first season and 20.5 points and 9.5 rebounds per game in his second season.  After his second season, Lloreda was named NJCAA National Player of the Year after leading his team to an 82-81 national championship over Coffeyville Community College.

Lloreda played his last two years of college ball for Louisiana State University.  He started 29 of 30 games in his first season with the Tigers, averaging 12.3 points and 9 rebounds per game in helping the Tigers to an NCAA Tournament appearance.  He scored 21 points and grabbed 14 rebounds in a first round loss to Purdue University.  In his second season with the Tigers, Lloreda averaged 16.9 points and an SEC-leading 11.6 rebounds per game en route to being selected First Team All-Southeastern Conference.  Despite playing only two years with the Tigers, he ranks fifth on the career blocked shots list and sixth in career field goal percentage.

Professional career
Although considered a candidate to be drafted in the 2004 NBA Draft on the strength of his solid LSU career, Lloreda went undrafted.  He began his professional career overseas with Pınar Karşıyaka of the Turkish Basketball League.  In 18 games with the team, Lloreda put up strong numbers, averaging 15.8 points and 9.7 rebounds per game.  The following year, he joined Lokomotiv Rostov of the Russian Basketball Super League.  He averaged 14.9 points and 10.9 rebounds in 14 games of league action and 16.8 points and 11.5 rebounds in FIBA EuroCup action, helping the team to a quarterfinal appearance.  In the succeeding seasons, Lloreda has bounced around the globe to teams in Saudi Arabia, Bosnia, Italy, and Panama.  At season 2008-09, he played for Seven 2007 Roseto of the Italian League, averaging 15.3 points and 9.5 rebounds per game in 19 games of action.

National team career
Lloreda is a long-time member of the Panama men's national basketball team.  He competed for the team at the 2005, 2007, and 2009 FIBA Americas Championship and the 2009 FIBA COCABA Championship.  He also participated in the 2006 FIBA World Championship with the team after they were a surprise qualifier by finishing fifth at the FIBA Americas Championship 2005, despite starting off the quarterfinal round with an 0-3 record.

References

External links
Eurobasket.com Profile
Italian League Profile 

1980 births
Living people
2006 FIBA World Championship players
Atenas basketball players
Atléticos de San Germán players
Basket Zaragoza players
Basketball players at the 2007 Pan American Games
Centers (basketball)
Central American and Caribbean Games silver medalists for Panama
Ciclista Olímpico players
Competitors at the 2006 Central American and Caribbean Games
Utah Tech Trailblazers men's basketball players
Halcones Rojos Veracruz players
Junior college men's basketball players in the United States
Karşıyaka basketball players
KK Bosna Royal players
LSU Tigers basketball players
Pallacanestro Varese players
Pan American Games competitors for Panama
Panamanian men's basketball players
Panamanian expatriate sportspeople in Russia
Panamanian expatriate sportspeople in Turkey
Panamanian expatriate sportspeople in Uruguay
PBC Lokomotiv-Kuban players
Sportspeople from Colón, Panama
Power forwards (basketball)
Roseto Sharks players
Central American and Caribbean Games medalists in basketball